Byalynichy District (Belynichsky raion) is a raion (district) in Mogilev Region, Belarus, the administrative center is the urban-type settlement of Byalynichy. As of 2009, its population was 21,839. Population of Byalynichy accounts for 48.9% of the district's population.

Notable residents 

 Vitold Byalynitsky-Birulya (1872, Krynki village – 1957) - Belarusian landscape painter

References

 
Districts of Mogilev Region